NGC 145, also known as Arp 19, is a barred spiral galaxy in Cetus, notable for its three spiral arms.

References

External links
 
 

NGC 0145
0145
019
-1-2-27
001941
NGC 0145